The Liberia Music Awards, commonly known as the MTN Liberia Music Awards for sponsoship reasons, is a Liberian music awards ceremony held since 2014 to celebrate musicians living in Liberia and in the diaspora. The first Liberia Music Awards ceremony was held on June 14, 2014, at the Gwinnet Performing Arts Center in Atlanta, Georgia.

Categories
The following are the categories for the ceremony:

Collaboration of the Year
Hipco/Trapco Song of the Year
Traditional/Gbema Artist of the Year
Video Director of the Year
Song of the Year
Hipco/ Trapco Artist of the Year
International Artist of the Year
Video Of The Year
Afro Pop Song of the Year
Afro Pop Artist of the Year

Female Artist of the Year
Male Artist of the Year
Producer of the Year
DJ of the Year
Reggae/Dancehall Artist of the Year
New Artist of the Year
Album of the Year
Hip Hop Artist of the Year
Gospel Artist of the Year
Artist of the Year

References

Award ceremonies
African music awards
Annual events